In model theory, Tarski's exponential function problem asks whether the theory of the real numbers together with the exponential function is decidable. Alfred Tarski had previously shown that the theory of the real numbers (without the exponential function) is decidable.

The problem

The ordered real field R is a structure over the language of ordered rings Lor = (+,·,−,<,0,1), with the usual interpretation given to each symbol.  It was proved by Tarski that the theory of the real field, Th(R), is decidable.  That is, given any Lor-sentence φ there is an effective procedure for determining whether

He then asked whether this was still the case if one added a unary function exp to the language that was interpreted as the exponential function on R, to get the structure Rexp.

Conditional and equivalent results

The problem can be reduced to finding an effective procedure for determining whether any given exponential polynomial in n variables and with coefficients in Z has a solution in Rn.   showed that Schanuel's conjecture implies such a procedure exists, and hence gave a conditional solution to Tarski's problem. Schanuel's conjecture deals with all complex numbers so would be expected to be a stronger result than the decidability of Rexp, and indeed, Macintyre and Wilkie proved that only a real version of Schanuel's conjecture is required to imply the decidability of this theory.

Even the real version of Schanuel's conjecture is not a necessary condition for the decidability of the theory.  In their paper, Macintyre and Wilkie showed that an equivalent result to the decidability of Th(Rexp) is what they dubbed the Weak Schanuel's Conjecture.  This conjecture states that there is an effective procedure that, given n ≥ 1 and exponential polynomials in n variables with integer coefficients f1,..., fn, g, produces an integer η ≥ 1 that depends on n, f1,..., fn, g, and such that if α ∈ Rn is a non-singular solution of the system

then either g(α) = 0 or |g(α)| > η−1.

Workaround 

Recently there are attempts at handling the theory of the real numbers with functions such as the exponential function or sine by relaxing decidability to the weaker notion of quasi-decidability. A theory is quasi-decidable if there is a procedure that decides satisfiability but that may run forever for inputs that are not robust in a certain, well-defined sense. Such a procedure exists for systems of  equations in  variables .

References

Model theory
Unsolved problems in mathematics